Annalisa Piras  is a London-based Italian-British film director, impact producer and journalist. She is currently the director of Springshot Productions, an independent production company which specialises in hard hitting, current affairs documentaries. She also directs The Wake Up Foundation, an educational charity she co-founded with Bill Emmott, former editor of The Economist. In 2019 The Wake Up Foundation founded and run the first Wake Up Europe Impact Films Festival, the first ever transnational impact documentary festival entirely devoted to showcase the best films produced worldwide to highlights the shared challenges our western societies face, with a special focus on the meaning of a European civic conscience. The Wake Up Europe Festival offered a "selection for reflection" of 10 films, which were screened and debated in Turin, Italy and across other nine European locations.

Piras'2016 film, "Europe at Sea", a feature-length documentary co-produced by Arte and SVT was nominated for the 2016 Prix Europa, the Oscar of European Documentaries. It was broadcast across the world in 2017. The film looks at Europe's role on the global stage in light of today's transnational security challenges and the shifting sands of geopolitics. It gained exclusive access for the first time to the EU top diplomat, the High Representative for Foreign and Security Policies Federica Mogherini.

In 2015 Annalisa Piras directed “The Great European Disaster Movie”, the first ever film on the EU crisis from an international point of view. It was produced by BBC and Arte among others.

“The Great European Disaster Movie” won the 2016 prestigious German CIVIS media prize in the information category. The film was selected among 930 applications from media programmes from all over Europe. The prize was bestowed by the German Federal President Joachim Gauck and the President of the European Parliament Martin Schulz at a star studded event in the German Federal Foreign Office in Berlin in May 2016.The film shot in 2014 predicted Brexit, the hardening of the migrant crisis, and the unravelling of the idealism behind the European integration project. Since then, it has become somehow a cult movie among audiences aware of the potential consequences of the slow disintegration of the collaboration spirit of the EU.

On May 19, 2016, in recognition of the educational and thought provoking value of The Great European Disaster Movie, the president of the Chamber of Deputies of Italy, On. Laura Boldrini, invited Annalisa Piras and Bill Emmott to screen the film in the Italian Parliament in front of an audience of Rome's secondary schools students.
https://presidenteboldrini.camera.it/20?album=1667&raccolta=2077https://presidenteboldrini.camera.it/20?album=1667&raccolta=2077

Career

As EU senior editor, Piras was part of the initial team which launched Euronews, the pan-European multilingual news television channel, on 1 January 1993 in Lyon, France.

Piras was the London Correspondent for L'Espresso from 1997 to 2011 and for La7 TV for six years. From 2006 to 2007 Annalisa was the first Italian president of the London Foreign Press Association.

In 2008, Piras' BBC Radio 4 documentary The Italian Patient was shortlisted as the FPA Best Story of the Year by a UK-based foreign correspondent.  Her TV documentary on the Hutton Enquiry, written and directed for La7 TV, was shortlisted for the same award in 2003.

In 2011 and 2012 Piras produced, co-wrote and directed the first independent feature documentary on Italy seen from abroad, Girlfriend in a Coma, co-written and narrated by Bill Emmott, former editor of The Economist, inspired by his book Good Italy, Bad Italy (Yale University Press).

Piras collected the 2011 PEN/Pinter prize on behalf of Italian writer, Roberto Saviano, who was unable to attend the ceremony in person because of the failure of the metropolitan police to offer him adequate protection. In addressing Saviano's life under the shadow of Mafia death threats, Piras delivered a speech in honour of his courage, "with a passion that was raw, exposed and moving".

In 2013 Piras founded the Wake Up Foundation, with the aim to raise public awareness about the current state and decline of the Western Societies through film and storytelling. Through the Wake Up Foundation, Piras and Bill Emmott launched in 2013 the campaign Wake Up Europe! to foster political debate and citizen's participation about the greatest challenges facing Europe. The Wake Up Europe Campaign has since been organising hundreds of documentary screenings and debates across the world, from the Italian Parliament, Montecitorio to a small Town Hall in Denmark or prestigious Universities such as Oxford or Cambridge, the campaign has engaged thousands of citizens fostering informed debates about the future of our societies.

In 2014 Piras wrote, directed and produced with Bill Emmott the documentary  “The Great European Disaster Movie” on the crisis of the European Union co-produced by Nick Fraser for the BBC Storyville strand, Claudia Bucher, for Arte TV, Axel Arno for SVT, Swedish public TV.

"Europe at Sea", a feature-length documentary co-produced by ARTE and SVT and written, produced and directed by Piras followed for two years the footsteps of Federica Mogherini, the High Representative of the European Union for Foreign Affairs and Security Policy, as she tried to implement the EU Global Strategy, while facing a relentless series of crisis, andunexpected turns, from the vote on Brexit, to the election of President Trump, to the deepening of the refugees and migrants challenge in the South Mediterranean. The film is a unique document to analyses Europe's role on the global stage in light of today's challenges from the perspective of the person called upon to implement a shared European vision, which is sorely elusive.

Piras is a regular member of the BBC Dateline London panel.
She also provided analysis on European and Italian Current Affairs for The Guardian.

As a political and social commentator she frequently appears on BBC News, Sky News, CNN, Al Jazeera and CNBC.

Girlfriend in a Coma 

In 2012 Annalisa Piras produced, co-wrote and directed the first independent feature documentary on Italy as seen from abroad, Girlfriend in a Coma, working with Bill Emmott, former editor of The Economist, as co-author and narrator. The film was made by Springshot Productions.

The documentary is inspired by Emmott's book Good Italy, Bad Italy (Yale University Press), as well as by Piras's patriotic passion and insight about the country she left in the early 1990s.
The film aims to introduce Italians and the World to the dark side of the country's political, economic and social decline, the product of a moral collapse in the West. It was broadcast on BBC Four, Sky Italia and La7 TV channels early in 2013, and subsequently on other channels worldwide as well as in public screenings. https://uniondocs.org/event/2013-10-13-girlfriend-in-a-coma/

The “Girlfriend in a Coma” title is a citation of a British musical hit by The Smiths from their album Strangeways (1987).

The Great European Disaster Movie 

In 2014 Annalisa Piras wrote, directed and produced with Bill Emmott the documentary  “The Great European Disaster Movie” on the crisis of the European Union. In an artfully constructed depiction of how Europe is sleepwalking toward disaster, starring Angus Deayton in fiction scenes from a postEU future, the film pairs an imagined view from a dystopian future with insightful, cross national analysis by ordinary Europeans and high level experts on how and why things are going so wrong. Notable interviewees include French economist Thomas Piketty, Martin Wolf, chief economic commentator at the Financial Times, former EU trade commissioner Peter Mandelson, and many former ministers and high level EU officials in various European countries.

In an authored piece of committed journalism, the filmmakers argue powerfully that, while economic crisis and popular anger are pushing Europe dangerously towards disintegration, the EU is in need of major reform but well worth saving. Subtle, moving, thought provoking and witty, “The Great European Disaster Movie” is far more than a political film but instead frames Europe through the eyes of those who are most important to its success: the Europeans themselves.

Reception

The Great European Disaster Movie is a BBC/ARTE and 7 other European broadcasters coproduction, which has now been watched by 2.360.000 viewers, one million of which in France and Germany. The film premièred on BBC Four, as part of the Storyville strand, on 1 March 2015. It was subsequently broadcast in 12 countries (UK, France, Germany, Switzerland, Austria, Belgium, Italy, Spain, Sweden, Denmark, Norway and Japan) and has been translated in 10 languages, including Japanese.

“The Great European Disaster Movie” has won the prestigious German CIVIS media prize in the information category. The film has been selected among 930 applications by media programmes from all over Europe. The prize was bestowed by the German Federal President Joachim Gauck and the President of the European Parliament Martin Schulz at a star studded event in the German Federal Foreign Office in Berlin in the presence of EU broadcasters yesterday evening May 12.  Watch the video
 
Controversy

The film generated a great deal of media controversy in the UK, with some critics taking exception at the BBC broadcasting an authored piece with an overtly pro-European slant and others accusing the authors of scaremongering. The BBC broadcast was followed by a live studio debate on Newsnight, the BBC's news and current affairs programme, during which exec producer Bill Emmott faced several prominent eurosceptic critics.

Director Annalisa Piras responded to the attacks in a piece for the Guardian and refuted the points more fully on the film's website in a joint piece with Emmott.

Both Piras and Emmott became the subjects of vitriolic attacks on Twitter by people who argued the film was a piece of ‘EU propaganda’ despite its strong criticism of the EU institutions.

Other Reactions

In his review for The Independent We could find ourselves back into the Europe of our nightmares., John Popham called film is a “wake-up call for all those for whom departure from the union could not come a moment too soon and would be the one-stop solution to all our ills, from immigration to health-and-safety nannying”.  The film also received positive coverage in Italy where it was reviewed by Il Sole 24, Il Fatto Quotidiano and La Repubblica and France. In his review for La Stampa, Brussels Correspondent Marco Zatterin argued that the film unleashed such a “violent” reaction among British eurosceptics because it “invaded their territory by criticising Europe but with a view to rebuild it.”

On 14 September 2016 the director of the Galleria Civica d’Arte Moderna e Contemporanea and of Castello di Rivoli Carolyn Christov-Bakargiev, invited Annalisa Piras and Bill Emmott to screen and debate the film at Castello di Rivoli because she said " I watched the movie one year ago and I was very keen to invite the authors because The Great European disaster Movie is a work of Art which belongs to the history of Cinema".
https://www.artribune.com/attualita/2016/09/gam-torino-film-brexit-annalisa-piras/

References

External links 
 Video of "Girlfriend In a Coma" Screening at ICA - London
 riscatto-amica-coma-081838.shtml?uuid=AbgfySAH/ Il riscatto dell'amica in coma. Il Sole 24 Ore
 
 "Chi sveglierà la ragazza in coma?"
 
 
 
 
 The Wake Up Foundation
 

1966 births
Living people
Italian journalists
Italian film directors
English-language film directors
English television directors
British women television directors